Blair S. Lewis, M.D., F.A.C.P., F.A.C.G., (born November 23, 1956 in Hartford, Connecticut) is an American board-certified gastroenterologist and Clinical Professor of Medicine at the Mount Sinai School of Medicine. Lewis is a specialist in the field of gastrointestinal endoscopy and was the primary investigator for the first clinical trial of capsule endoscopy for the small intestine and also the first clinical trial of capsule endoscopy for the colon.

Biography 
Lewis graduated from Dartmouth College in 1978 and earned his medical degree from Albert Einstein College of Medicine in 1982. He completed his residency in Internal Medicine at Montefiore Medical Center in 1985 and his fellowship in Gastroenterology at Mount Sinai Medical Center in 1987. Lewis was appointed Clinical Professor of Medicine in 2002 at Mount Sinai School of Medicine, where he continues to teach today.

He co-chairs the International Conference of Capsule Endoscopy  and coordinated the Consensus Conference statements to guide capsule usage. He is past president of the New York Society for Gastrointestinal Endoscopy and New York Academy of Gastroenterology and has served on the board of the American College of Gastroenterology. Lewis has written over 72 scientific papers and 27 chapters and he has authored 3 books; all in the field of gastrointestinal endoscopy. He co-authored the technical document behind the American Gastroenterological Association's position statement concerning occult and obscure gastrointestinal bleeding and the ICCE consensus statement for clinical application of capsule endoscopy. He also helped develop a scoring index for inflammatory bowel disease seen on capsule endoscopy.

Lewis has published widely on gastroenterological research and co-authored multiple books including: Gastroenterology for the House Officer (1989), Flexible Sigmoidoscopy (1996), Gastrointestinal Endoscopy Clinics of North America; Enteroscopy (1999), and Capsule Endoscopy Simplified (2010). He also holds editorial positions at multiple medical journals including: Gastroenterology, Digestive Diseases and Sciences, American Journal of Gastroenterology, Gastrointestinal Endoscopy, Southern Medical Journal, Endoscopy, Journal of Clinical Gastroenterology, and The Medical Letter.

Honors and awards
Lewis received the Distinguished Service Award from Mount Sinai School of Medicine in 1996; Gastroenterology Divisional Award from Mount Sinai in 1989; Leo M. Davidoff Society Award from Montefiore Hospital in 1983; the Sigma Xi Award for Undergraduate Research in 1978 from Dartmouth College; High Distinction in Biology in 1978 from Dartmouth College; and was a Rufus Choate Scholar at Dartmouth College in 1977.

He is listed as one of the 75 Best Gastroenterologists in America in 2010, and also as one of the 125 Leading Gastroenterologists in 2011 by Becker's ASC Review. CastleConnolly.com names him in the Best Doctors of America and the Best 100 Doctors in Manhattan lists. He has also been listed as one of the top 5% of New York City doctors by SuperDoctors.com for the years 2008–2011. He has received the Patient's Choice Award for two successive years by PatientsChoice.org.

Publications

References

External links
The Mount Sinai Hospital homepage
The Mount Sinai School of Medicine homepage

American gastroenterologists
American medical academics
Icahn School of Medicine at Mount Sinai faculty
Albert Einstein College of Medicine alumni
Dartmouth College alumni
People from Hartford, Connecticut
1956 births
Living people